Trametes betulina (formerly Lenzites betulina), sometimes known by common names gilled polypore, birch mazegill or multicolor gill polypore, is a species of inedible fungus.

Although it is a member of the Polyporales order, its fruiting bodies have gills instead of pores, which distinguishes it from the superficially similar Trametes versicolor or Trametes hirsuta. Research has shown that it has several medicinal properties, including antioxidant, antimicrobial, antitumor, and immunosuppressive activities.

References

External links 

 Index Fungorum
 USDA ARS Fungal Database
 “Lenzites betulina” by Robert Sasata, Healing-Mushrooms.net, September, 2007.
 California Fungi—Trametes betulina
 Lenzites betulina, The Mushroom Farm

Fungal plant pathogens and diseases
Polyporaceae
Fungi of Europe
Fungi of North America
Fungi described in 1838
Inedible fungi